The Lawhouse Experience, Volume One is a hip hop compilation album presented by American producer Larry "Laylaw" Goodman. The eighteen-track album features guest appearances from several notable West Coast hip hop recording artists, such as Above The Law, Coolio, Dru Down, Ice Cube, Ice-T, Kausion, K-Dee, Kokane, Luniz, L.V., Ras Kass, The Pharcyde, WC and Xzibit. Recording sessions for the album took place at Da Lawhouse Recording Studio Complex in Los Angeles, California. It was released on August 29, 1997, via Zomba Records. Audio production of the album was handled primarily by Laylaw and Derrick "D'Maq" McDowell. It peaked at number 169 on the US Billboard 200 and at number 43 on the US Billboard Top R&B/Hip-Hop Albums.

Critical reception 

Rap Pages "...The Lawhouse Experience, Volume One showcases different styles of hip hop that are currently being perfected in the L.A. metro area, as well as adding a little Bay area flavor from the Luniz and Dru Down...."

The Source "...We were just being New York bias back in 1997 and this body of work is better than just 2.5 mics..."

Track listing 

Sample credits
Track 8 contains elements from "Chameleon" by Herbie Hancock, and "Flash Light" by Parliament
Track 15 contains elements from "Gin and Juice" by Snoop Doggy Dogg

Personnel

Alvin Nathaniel Joiner – performer (track 2)
Amp Blaq – producer, executive producer
Andre James McJimson – executive producer
Arthur Lee Goodman III – performer (track 7)
Artis Leon Ivey Jr. – performer (track 1)
Bob Morse – engineering
Carl Kenneth Small – percussion
Command A Studios, Inc. – design
Danyel Robinson – performer (track 10)
Darrell L. Johnson – performer (track 14)
Derrick K. McDowell – producer (tracks: 2–3, 6–8, 10–12, 15–16), mixing
Derrick Stewart – performer (track 15)
Doug Haverty – art direction
Gregory Fernan Hutchison – performer (track 11)
Jerry B. Long Jr. – performer (tracks: 1, 18)
John Austin IV – performer (track 2)
Johnny Buzzerio – photography
Kausion – performers (track 8)
Kevin Michael Gulley – performer (track 11)
Kohl Blaq – producer, executive producer
Lawrence Goodman – producer, mixing
Luniz – performers (track 10)
Mark Chalecki – mastering
O'Shea Jackson Sr. – performer (track 4)
Phalos Mode – performer (track 12)
Phat Freddie – performer (tracks: 5, 17)
Premro Smith – performer (track 13)
Romye Robinson – performer (track 15)
Sean "Barney Rubble" Thomas – keyboards
Stealth – producer
Tracy Lauren Marrow – performer (track 6)
Tristan G. Jones – mixing
William Loshawn Calhoun, Jr. – performer (track 3)

Chart history

References

External links 

1997 compilation albums
Albums produced by Laylaw
Gangsta rap compilation albums
West Coast hip hop compilation albums